On July 2, 1991, Eldon Maguan, a 25 year old engineering student at De La Salle University, was shot in the head by Rolito Go, a 43 year old construction magnate in a road rage incident at Wilson Street in Little Baguio, San Juan, Metro Manila, the Philippines.

Six days after the shooting incident, Go turned himself in to the San Juan police and was charged with murder. In 1993, Go was convicted of murder by the Pasig Regional Trial Court for a 40-year jail term.

Shooting
On July 2, 1991, Eldon Maguan was driving his car along the one-way section of Wilson Street headed towards Pedro Guevarra Street in Little Baguio, San Juan, Metro Manila, when Rolito Go — who had recently fought with his girlfriend at Cravings Bakeshop & Restaurant — drove away from the restaurant while counterflowing on the one-way section of Wilson Street. In doing so, he nearly hit Maguan's car at the intersection of Wilson Street and Jose Abad Santos Street. Go then alighted his car, walked over to Maguan's car, and shot him in the head while inside his vehicle. Go then fled the scene on his car.

Investigation
Shortly after the incident, the San Juan police arrived and found an empty shell and a live 9 mm caliber ammunition round on the scene.

While determining the initial location of the shooter, the police was able to obtain Go's vehicle registration plate from the security guard of Alex III, a restaurant at the intersection where the incident happened. An facsimile of his credit card was also obtained at Cravings, where he had dined prior to the incident. The security guard at Cravings was also able to identify Go as the perpetrator, and Land Transportation Office records showed that the Go's car was registered to his wife, Elsa Ang Go.

Arrest and trial
A manhunt was commenced, and six days after the incident, Go turned himself in to the San Juan police on July 8, 1991 with two lawyers. An eyewitness at the police station had also identified him as the gunman. Go was positively identified as the gunman and detained. The same day, the San Juan police filed a complaint for frustrated homicide to the Office of the Provincial Prosecutor of Rizal. Go was informed in the presence of his lawyers by First Assistant provincial prosecutor Dennis Villa Ignacio, that he could sign a waiver to avail for the right to preliminary investigation based on the provisions of Article 125 of the Revised Penal Code. However, neither Go nor his lawyers executed the waiver. On July 9, 1991, Maguan died of his gunshot wounds. As a result, on July 11, 1991, the prosecutor elevated the charges to murder before the Pasig Regional Trial Court with no recommendation for bail.

On August 23, 1991, Go was detained at the Rizal Provincial Jail during his trial, which commenced on September 19, 1991. At the end of his trial, however, Go escaped from the Rizal Provincial Jail (RPJ) on November 1, 1993 — a few days before the Pasig Regional Trial Court would sentence him to reclusión perpetua, or a term of 40 years in prison, on November 5, 1997. The Maguan family believed that Go had actually bribed the guards at the RPJ, who were later dismissed from service. On April 30, 1997, Go was found and rearrested in a piggery in Pampanga. Go had also tried to bribe his arrestors in exchange for his freedom but was turned down.

Incarceration
In 1999, Go petitioned the Supreme Court to reverse or modify the verdict of the Pasig Regional Trial Court, which was affirmed by the Court of Appeals. The Supreme Court ruled with finality against the petition on January 10, 2000. Afterwards, Go was transferred to the maximum security compound of the New Bilibid Prison (NBP) in Muntinlupa, Metro Manila.

In October 2008, Department of Justice secretary Raul M. Gonzalez said Go was eligible for a presidential pardon as he had served half of his prison sentence. After fulfilling a required number of years in jail, Go was moved to the minimum security compound in Bilibid in 2009 and was granted live-out status by the Bureau of Corrections under BuCor director Oscar Calderon. Go attempted to apply for parole on multiple occasions, which was rejected by the Supreme Court and opposed by Maguan's family, who pleaded Philippine president Gloria Macapagal Arroyo not to extend any pardon to Go. Go would later seek work at the Ina ng Awa church inside the NBP grounds while in the minimum security compound.

2011 New Bilibid Prison furlough controversy
In May 2011, the Department of Justice opened an inquiry on an unauthorized prison furlough incident in which former Batangas governor Antonio Leviste was allowed to leave his confinement at the New Bilibid Prison for a supposed dental appointment.

During the investigation, it was revealed by a senior BuCor official that Rolito Go would frequently go in and out of the NBP to visit the office of his lending company in the nearby Soldiers' Hills Village in Muntinlupa, leaving the NBP at noon and returning a few hours later. As a result of the controversy, BuCor director Ernesto Diokno went on administrative leave and shortly resigned after.

Alleged kidnapping
At 11:30 pm on August 14, 2012, Go was reported as missing when he did not appear during a head count at the New Bilibid Prison. His last known reported whereabouts was at the Ina ng Awa church, where his nephew, Clemence Yu, was nursing his wounds. The following day, after Yu did not return home, Go's family informed Department of Justice secretary Leila de Lima that they were able to reach Go and Yu by phone, who informed them that they had been kidnapped for a ransom of  million (US$).

As a result, administrative cases were filed against the NBP's minimum security prison warden and a prison guard who was assigned as Go's custodian. The two officers were ordered dismissed by NBP superintendent Richard Schwarskopf Jr. An investigation was launched by the Philippine National Police's Criminal Investigation and Detection Group and the National Bureau of Investigation. A hold departure order was also issued by Bureau of Immigration commissioner Ricardo David, instructing all airports and seaports to be on the lookout for Go. A Senate probe was also sought by senator Gregorio Honasan to investigate whether the additional legislation is needed to protect inmates from kidnapping incidents.

The Maguan family was in disbelief over the kidnapping incident, as Eldon Maguan's older brother, Ellis Maguan, stated that Go was a "bigtime government contractor and wealthy businessman" prior to the murder incident in 1991. Ellis also questioned the Go family's kidnapping alibi as being orchestrated between the family and the abductors. A day later, Go and Yu were found and taken into custody by the PNP Anti-Kidnapping Group in Alabang, Muntinlupa after intercepting them on a bus.

In a press conference, NBP chief superintendent Generoso Cerbo Jr. stated that Go told the police that he and Yu were released by their alleged kidnappers based in Tanauan, Batangas. Go's family claimed that no ransom was paid in exchange for the release of the two.

2014 release order
In 2014, the Muntinlupa Regional Trial Court granted Go's petition to be released from prison, who argued that he had already fully served his sentence based on an adjusted computation of his prison term. However, De Lima directed that Go would not be released following her directive to the Office of the Solicitor General to file a motion for reconsideration to appeal the court order.

De Lima maintained that Go has not yet completed his prison term based on the computation of the BuCor, while Go claims he had already been granted "colonist status", making him eligible for good conduct time allowance credits to reduce his prison sentence.

Release
On November 28, 2016, after 25 years in prison, the Supreme Court ruled its decision to release Rolito Go from prison based on his transfer to the Iwahig Prison and Penal Farm and good conduct which had commuted his sentence to 30 years. The Maguans' lawyer, attorney Jose Flaminiano, stated on December 17, 2016 that the Maguan family will no longer take legal action to petition the Supreme Court's ruling.

At the time of ruling, Go was confined at the Metropolitan Medical Center in Santa Cruz, Manila for stage 4 colorectal cancer.

References

Supreme Court of the Philippines cases
Murder in the Philippines
Trials in the Philippines
Crime in Metro Manila
1991 murders in the Philippines